Edmund Jagiełło (14 November 1946 – 11 November 2020) was a Polish politician who served as a member of the Sejm, and later as a Senator as a member of the Polish United Workers' Party.

References

External links
 Sejm data archive

1946 births
2020 deaths
20th-century Polish politicians
Polish United Workers' Party members
People from Pajęczno County